Tapayúna (Kajkwakhrattxi or Kajkwakhratxi, also spelt Tapajúna, Tapayúna: Kajkwakhrattxi kawẽrẽ ) is a Northern Jê language (Jê, Macro-Jê) spoken in Mato Grosso, Brazil by the Tapayúna (Kajkwakhrattxi) people.

The Tapayuna historically lived on the Arinos River, in the Tapajós basin, between Juruena and Aripuanã. They were decimated in mid-20th century as a result of numerous conflicts with Brazilian settlers, rubber tappers, and ranchers; it is estimated that their population declined 90% until reaching 41 individuals in 1969, which has been characterized as an ethnocide. The surviving Tapayúna were then transferred to Xingu Indigenous Park at some point between 1969 and 1970, resulting in 10 more deaths. At first, they stayed with the Kĩsêdjê, speakers of a closely related language. Later, many Tapayúna moved to Terra Indígena Capoto-Jarina, where they went on to live with the Mẽtyktire subgroup of the Kayapó people, speakers of another Northern Jê language, Mẽbêngôkre. It is assumed that the Tapayúna language has been influenced both by Kĩsêdjê and Mẽbêngôkre. In 2010, 97 speakers have been reported in the Kawêrêtxikô village (Capoto-Jarina). In contrast, only a few elders speak the language in the Ngôsôkô village (Wawi), where the Kĩsêdjê are the ethnic majority. The number of speakers in the Ngôjhwêrê village (Wawi) is unknown.

Tapayúna is closely related to Kĩsêdjê; together, they form the Tapajós branch of Northern Jê. The common past on the Tapajós River, shared by the Tapayúna and the Kĩsêdjê, is still part of their oral history. Phonological differences between the languages include the reflexes of Proto-Northern Jê *m/*mb, *mr/*mbr, *c (in onsets), *ñ (in codas), and *b (in stressed syllables). In Tapayúna, these consonants are reflected as w ([w̃]), nr ([ɾ̃]), t ([t̪]), j ([j]), and w ([w]), respectively, whereas Kĩsêdjê has m/mb, mr/mbr, s, n, and p in the same words.

Phonology

Consonants
Tapayúna innovated with respect to Proto-Tapajós via the following sound changes:
merger of *t̪ʰ and *t̪ as t /t̪ʰ/;
*p > w /w/;
*m(b), *m(b)r > w /w̃/, nr /ɾ̃/;
*kʰj, *mbj > x /tʃ/, j /j/;
*-m, *-n, -ñ > /-p/, /-t/, /-j/.

Vowels
The vowel inventory of Tapayuna is shown below (the orthographic representation is given in italics; the characters in slashes stand for the IPA values of each vowel).

Echo vowels
Tapayúna has a phenomenon whereby an echo vowel is inserted in words whose underlying form ends in a consonant. The epenthesized vowels are unstressed, as in rowo [ˈɾɔwɔ] ‘jaguar’, tàgà [ˈtʌgʌ] ‘bird’, khôgô [ˈkʰogo] ‘wind’.

Morphology

Inflectional morphology

Finiteness
As in all other Northern Jê languages, verbs inflect for finiteness and thus have a basic opposition between a finite form (also Short Form and main form) and a nonfinite form (also Long Form). Finite forms are used in matrix clauses only, whereas nonfinite forms are used in all types of subordinate clauses as well as in some matrix clauses (including negated, future, and progressive clauses). Nonfinite forms are most often formed via suffixation and/or prefix substitution. Some verbs (including all descriptives with the exception of katho ‘to leave’, whose nonfinite form is kathoro) lack an overt finiteness distinction.

The available nonfinite suffixes are /-ɾ/ (the most common option, found in many transitive and intransitive verbs), /-j/ (found in transitive verbs and in some intransitives whose stem ends in the vowel /a/), as well as /-k/ and /-p/ (found in a handful of intransitive verbs which take a nominative subject when finite), as shown in the table below.

In Proto-Northern Jê, several verbs derived their finite forms by means of leniting the stem-final consonant (*-t, *-c, *-k → *-r, *-j, *-r). In Tapayúna, at least two verbs retain this pattern, though the relation between the finite and nonfinite forms has been obfuscated by a series of regular sound changes, including *-ôj > -wâj (-âj after a labial), *-c > -t.

The erstwhile palatalizing prefix
In Proto-Northern Jê, a small set of verbs formed their nonfinite forms by employing one of the aforementioned processes and a morphophonological process whereby the onset of the stressed syllable became palatal, and the nucleus of the stressed syllable was raised (if possible); this has been attributed to the influence of an underlying palatalizing nonfinite prefix. In Tapayúna, at least two verbs still follow the archaic pattern.

{| class="wikitable" style="text-align: center;"
! finite !! nonfinite !! gloss
|-
| ka || tàrà || to roast
|-
| ngõrõ || nhõn || to sleep
|}

Prefix substitution or loss
In addition to the aforementioned processes, the finiteness inflection may involve prefix substitution or loss. For example, the valency-reducing prefixes are a(j)- (anticausative) and a- (antipassive) in finite verb forms, but wi- and tá-/tu-, respectively, in the nonfinite forms. In addition, some verbs which denote physiological activities or movement have a prefix (i- and a-, respectively) in their finite forms but not in the nonfinite form. Some examples are given below.

{| class="wikitable" style="text-align: center;"
! finite !! nonfinite !! gloss
|-
| colspan="3" | anticausatives
|-
| ajkhẽ || wikhẽj || to have fun
|-
| colspan="3" | antipassives
|-
| awi || tàwiri || to go up
|-
| colspan="3" | physiological verbs
|-
| ikhõ || khõw || to drink
|-
| ikhwâ || khwârâ || to defecate
|-
| ithu || thur || to urinate
|-
| colspan="3" | movement verbs
|-
| atá || tárá || to enter (singular)|}

Nominal number
Nouns which denote human beings may receive the plural suffix -jê, as in wẽwyjê ‘men’ (← wẽwy) ‘man’.

Derivational morphology
Productive affixes
Tapayúna makes use of the diminutive suffixes -tĩ and -re, as well as of the augmentative suffix -txi. Examples include: taratĩ ‘its small wing’ or taratĩre ‘its tiny wing’ (← tara ‘its wing’, an inflected form of jara ‘wing’), hrytĩ ‘small, narrow path’ or hrytĩre ‘a very narrow path’ (← hry ‘path’), thêtxi ‘tick’ (← thê), wĩtxi ‘alligator’ (← wĩ).

Nominalizations which denote instruments and places are formed by means of attaching the suffix -tà to the nonfinite form of a verb: kahõ ‘to sweep’ → kahõj ‘to sweep (nonfinite)’ → kahõjtà ‘broom’; wẽ ‘people’ + khrĩ ‘to sit (plural, finite = nonfinite)’ → wẽkhrĩtà ‘seat’.

Agent nominalizations are formed by means of attaching the suffix -kanê to the nonfinite form of a verb: hwitô ‘leaf; paper’ + tôk ‘to paint; to write’ → hwĩtôtôkkanê''' ‘teacher’.

Lexicon
Predicate number
Tapayúna commonly employs different lexemes for the so called singular and plural predicates (see Northern Jê languages#Verbal number for more information about the semantic counterparts of this distinction in the Northern Jê languages).

References

External links
 Lapierre, Myriam. 2018. Kajkwakhrattxi Field Materials''. Survey of California and Other Indian Languages. 

Jê languages
Languages of Brazil